Single Rider is a studio album by American singer-songwriter Jenn Champion. It was released in July 2018 under Hardly Art.

Track listing

References

2018 albums
Hardly Art albums